Elachiptera is a genus of frit flies in the family Chloropidae. There are about 18 described species in Elachiptera.

Species
Elachiptera angusta Sabrosky, 1948
Elachiptera angustifrons Sabrosky, 1948
Elachiptera angustistylum Sabrosky, 1948
Elachiptera californica Sabrosky, 1948
Elachiptera costata (Loew, 1863)
Elachiptera decipiens (Loew, 1863)
Elachiptera erythropleura Sabrosky, 1948
Elachiptera flaviceps Sabrosky, 1948
Elachiptera formosa (Loew, 1863)
Elachiptera knowltoni Sabrosky, 1948
Elachiptera longiventris (Johannsen, 1924)
Elachiptera nigriceps (Loew, 1863)
Elachiptera pechumani Sabrosky, 1948
Elachiptera penita (Adams, 1908)
Elachiptera punctulata Becker, 1912
Elachiptera tau Sabrosky, 1948
Elachiptera vittata Sabrosky, 1948
Elachiptera willistoni Sabrosky, 1948

References

Further reading

External links

 Diptera.info

Oscinellinae
Taxa named by Pierre-Justin-Marie Macquart